Cristóbal Alejandro Campos Véliz (born 27 August 1999) is a Chilean footballer who plays as a goalkeeper for Universidad de Chile.

Club career
A product of Universidad de Chile youth system, as a young player, in 2017 Campos was loaned to Portuguese club Alcanenense, in addition to a brief test step in Sporting CP.

Despite not making his debut in the Chilean Primera División, he played his first official match for Universidad de Chile in a 2020 Copa Libertadores game versus Inter de Porto Alegre on February 11, 2020.

International career
He was called up to the Chile U20 squad for the 2019 South American U-20 Championship, but he didn't play any match. Also, he was a substitute in the friendly match of the Chile senior team against Burkina Faso on June 2, 2017.

References

External links
 
 Cristóbal Campos at playmakerstats.com (English version of ceroacero.es)

1999 births
Living people
People from Santiago Metropolitan Region
Chilean footballers
Chilean expatriate footballers
Chilean Primera División players
Universidad de Chile footballers
Association football goalkeepers
Expatriate footballers in Portugal 
Chilean expatriate sportspeople in Portugal